Nishiki Tenmangū is a Shinto shrine located in the Nakagyō-ku district of Kyoto, Japan.

History
In the year 1003 the shrine was established in the former residence of Sugawara no Koreyoshi, the father of Sugawara no Michizane (a scholar and a politician of the Heian period known as "the God of learning"). The shrine was moved to its current location in 1587 during the Azuchi-Momoyama period during the reconstruction of Kyoto by Toyotomi Hideyoshi.

References

Shinto shrines in Kyoto

Tenjin faith